Caitlin Renneson is a paralympic athlete from Canada competing mainly in category T34 sprint events.

Caitlin began her Paralympic career in the sprints at the 2000 Summer Paralympics competing in the T34 class 100m, 200m, and 400m, winning a bronze medal in the latter.  After missing the 2004 games she returned in 2008 to compete in the rowing events as part of the unsuccessful Mixed double sculls in the TAMix2x class.

References

Paralympic rowers of Canada
Athletes (track and field) at the 2000 Summer Paralympics
Living people
Paralympic track and field athletes of Canada
Paralympic bronze medalists for Canada
Rowers at the 2008 Summer Paralympics
Medalists at the 2000 Summer Paralympics
Canadian female rowers
Year of birth missing (living people)
Paralympic medalists in athletics (track and field)